Frescati may refer to:
Frescati (Ireland)
Frescati (Stockholm)

Both places are named after Frascati in Italy. The identical corruption of Frascati in both cases is a coincidence.